Coolus bushi is a species of skipper butterfly in the family Hesperiidae. It is the only species in the monotypic genus Coolus.

References 

Hesperiinae